The Nomad 22 is a British trailerable sailboat that was designed by Denys Rayner as a cruiser and first built in 1967.

The boat is a development of the Westerly 22.

Production
The design was built by Westerly Marine Construction in the United Kingdom, between 1967 and 1969, with 267 completed.

Design
The Nomad 22 is a recreational keelboat, built predominantly of glassfibre, with wood trim. It has a masthead sloop rig, a spooned raked stem, an angled transom, an internally mounted spade-type rudder controlled by a tiller and twin fixed keels, plus a centre skeg. It displaces  and carries  of ballast.

The boat is normally fitted with a small  outboard motor for docking and manoeuvring. A small Volvo Penta diesel or gasoline Vire inboard engine was optional.

The design has sleeping accommodation for four people, with a double "V"-berth in the bow cabin, an "L"-shaped settee and two straight settee berths in the main cabin. The galley is located on both sides amidships. The galley is equipped with a stove to port and a sink on the starboard side. The head is located just aft of the bow cabin on the starboard side.

For sailing the design may be equipped with one a series of jibs or genoas.

Operational history
The boat is supported by an active class club that organizes sailing events, the Westerly Owners Association.

In a 2010 review Steve Henkel wrote, "best features: She will sit on a half-tide mooring, thanks to her twin keels. A flatbed trailer will serve as a road conveyance. If a dodger is added, headroom becomes almost six feet. Worst features: Due to exceptionally large wetted surface, shallow twin keels and smallish sail area, it will take a good while to get anywhere, especially if 'anywhere' happens to be upwind. And if you plan to short-circuit your trip by motoring, get a tow car that can handle 5,500 pounds."

See also
List of sailing boat types

Related development
Westerly 22

References

Keelboats
1960s sailboat type designs
Sailing yachts
Trailer sailers
Sailboat type designs by Denys Rayner
Sailboat types built by Westerly Marine Construction